Spring Creek is an unincorporated community in Lawrence County, Tennessee, United States.

References

Unincorporated communities in Lawrence County, Tennessee
Unincorporated communities in Tennessee